Garden Valley may refer to:
 Garden Valley, California (disambiguation)
Garden Valley, El Dorado County, California
Garden Valley, Yuba County, California
 Garden Valley, Idaho
 Garden Valley, Nevada
 Garden Valley, Texas
 Garden Valley, Wisconsin